The 2005 Coastal Carolina Chanticleers football team represented Coastal Carolina University in the 2005 NCAA Division I-AA football season. The Chanticleers were led by third-year head coach David Bennett and played their home games at Brooks Stadium. Coastal Carolina competed as a member of the Big South Conference. They finished the season 9–2 with a 3–1 record in conference play, winning a share of the Big South championship.

Schedule

References

Coastal Carolina
Coastal Carolina Chanticleers football seasons
Big South Conference football champion seasons
Coastal Carolina Chanticleers football